Dennis Rudolph (born 1979 in Berlin, Germany) is a conceptual artist working primarily in augmented reality, virtual reality and painting. His artistic practice derives its primal momentum from a melancholic reworking of the heritage of western culture.

Biography
Rudolph lives and works in Berlin. He studied at the Language and Cultural Institute in Beijing, the Imperial Academy of Arts in St. Petersburg and the Berlin University of the Arts, where he graduated in 2004. Since 2004 his work has been on show in galleries in Europe and the US.

Work
In his first body of work, featuring explicitly traditional artistic media (such as oil painting, ink drawing and copperplate etching), Rudolph addressed German National Socialism with regard to its belated appropriation of the pre-modern entanglement of art and cult. „Deutsche Ahnengalerie“ (2006-2008), for example, is a portrait series based on photographs of nameless World War II soldiers, found on Berlin flea markets. The idealized style of these antique-like panel paintings referred to the religious form of the icon.

From 2012-2018, Rudolph had been involved with the project of updating Rodin's Gates to Hell. Conceptually "Das Portal" had to be on the threshold between two realities (Heaven and Hell) and was to be placed in California City. Within the framework of this large-scale project, Rudolph was going through an artistic crisis as he couldn’t find the right medium to fulfill the idea of his concept. It had to be a medium that is present and absent at the same time. It was only the invention of consumer Virtual Reality Headsets that helped him overcome the crisis and complete the project. With a VR 3D painting software he painted "Das Portal" digitally "on the other side" and placed it by building a GPS based Augmented Reality App for smart phones that projected the work on the Desert Butte in California City. Since then the Virtual Reality has dramatically changed his way of painting.

Exhibitions
 Fallen Angels, 
 JUMP, 
 California Dreaming, Galerie Jette Rudolph, Berlin (2014)
 Genèse de l'Enfer, Galerie Olivier Robert, Paris (2014)
 THE PORTAL Yurt, Moscow International Biennale for Young Art, Moscow (2014)
 PAINTING FOREVER!, Kunst-Werke Institute for Contemporary Art, Berlin (2013)
 Paradise Lost, Concord Art Space, Los Angeles (2012)
 Hallewujah, Apart, Stuttgart & Künstlerhaus Bethanien, Berlin (2011)
 Nemesis. Das Grosse Glück, Upstream Gallery, Amsterdam (2010)
 Black Hole, Kunsthalle Andratx, Mallorca (2009) - curated by Friederike Nymphius 
 The Holy War, Chapter I, The Sacrifice of Youth, Perry Rubenstein Gallery, New York (2008)
 Berlin Noir, Perry Rubenstein Gallery, New York (2007) - curated by Felix Ensslin 
 Männerfantasien, Chung King Project, Los Angeles (2007) - curated by Ellen Blumenstein

References

External links
  Official Website
 Upstream Gallery representing Dennis Rudolph
 Galerie Olivier Robert representing Dennis Rudolph
 Dennis Rudolph on GALERIES.NL
 Dennis Rudolph on artnet

German video artists
20th-century German painters
20th-century German male artists
German male painters
1979 births
Living people
German performance artists
21st-century German painters
21st-century German male artists